Dmitry Islamov (born December 5, 1977, Kemerovo) is a Russian political figure and a deputy of the 7th and 8th State Dumas.

After graduating from the Kuzbass State Technical University in 2000, Islamov went to the US and Great Britain for an internship. In 2003, he was awarded a Doctor of Sciences in Technical Sciences degree. In 1998–2003, he was also engaged in business. From 2003 to 2006, Islamov worked as a docent at the Kuzbass State Technical University. In 2006–2007, he headed the board of programs and investment policy of the administration of the Kemerovo region. In 2007, he was appointed deputy head of the Department of Economic Development of the Kemerovo Oblast. In September 2016, he was elected deputy of the 7th State Duma from the Kemerovo Oblast constituency. In 2021, he was re-elected for the 8th State Duma.

According to IStories, even though on average, the deputies of the 7th State Duma introduced around 55 bills during their term of office, Dmitry Islamov sent only three bills to the floor, two of them were adopted.

References

1977 births
Living people
United Russia politicians
21st-century Russian politicians
Eighth convocation members of the State Duma (Russian Federation)
Seventh convocation members of the State Duma (Russian Federation)
Russian individuals subject to European Union sanctions